Christopher Blauvelt is an American cinematographer, and a third generation film craftsman.  Blauvelt started his career in the camera and electrical department under cinematographers Harris Savides, Christopher Doyle and Lance Acord. He continued to work with cinematographer and mentor Harris Savides until his sudden death from brain cancer.  Blauvelt's continued work with Kelly Reichardt has garnered him an ICP Nomination in 2010 for his masterful work on Meek's Cutoff and best cinematography at the Valladolid International Film Festival for Night Moves.  Blauvelt shot Jeff Preiss’ directorial debut Low Down for producers Albert Berger and Ron Yerxa, which won the Dramatic Cinematography award at the 2014 Sundance Film Festival.

Selected filmography
May December (TBA) - Cinematographer
Showing Up (2022) - Cinematographer
 Emma. (2020) - Cinematographer
 First Cow (2019) - Cinematographer
 Mid90s (2018) - Cinematographer
 Don't Worry, He Won't Get Far on Foot (2018) - Cinematographer
 Certain Women (2016) - Cinematographer
 Indignation (2016) - Cinematographer
 How and Why (2015) - Cinematographer
 I Am Michael (2015) - Cinematographer
 Low Down (2014) - Cinematographer
 The Disappearance of Eleanor Rigby (2013) - Cinematographer
 Night Moves (2013) - Cinematographer
 Max Rose (2013) - Cinematographer
 The Bling Ring (2013) - Cinematographer
 The Discoverers (2012) - Cinematographer
 Nobody Walks (2012) - Cinematographer
 Beginners (2010) - Director of Photography: Additional Photography
 Meek's Cutoff (2010) - Cinematographer
 I'm Still Here (2010) - Camera Operator
 Greenberg (2010) - Camera Operator
 Where the Wild Things Are (2009) - Camera Operator
 A Single Man (2009) - Camera Operator
 Zodiac (2007) - Camera Operator

Music videos
 ALOKE "Pennywhistle" Directed by Jack Patrick (2007) – Cinematographer
 Tiny Hearts "Stay" Directed by Justin Kelly (2013) – Cinematographer
 El Perro Del Mar "Glory to the World" Directed by Emily De Groot - Cinematographer
 Green Day "Working Class Hero" Directed by Samuel Bayer - Cinematographer
 Turin Brakes "Underdog" Directed by Sophie Muller - Cinematographer
 Red Hot Chili Peppers  "Dark Necessities" (2016) music video
Grouplove "Deleter" - Director
Grouplove "Youth" - Director

Awards
In 2012, Variety hailed him as a "Cinematographer to Watch". In 2013, Indiewire also listed him as a "Cinematographer to Watch".

References

External links

American cinematographers
Living people
Year of birth missing (living people)